The All Saints Catholic Church in Taylorsville, Kentucky is a historic church on the east side of Jefferson Street between Park Alley and Red Row Alley.  It was built between 1830 and 1843.  It was added to the National Register in 1992.

It has some elements of Gothic Revival in style.

It was deemed significant as "one of the oldest extant Catholic churches in the Louisville archdiocese and as one of the early examples of Gothic Revival architecture used for church construction in the small towns of the region."

References

Roman Catholic churches in Kentucky
Churches on the National Register of Historic Places in Kentucky
Gothic Revival church buildings in Kentucky
Roman Catholic churches completed in 1830
19th-century Roman Catholic church buildings in the United States
National Register of Historic Places in Spencer County, Kentucky
1830 establishments in Kentucky
Churches in Spencer County, Kentucky
Buildings and structures in Taylorsville, Kentucky